The women's 4x400 metres relay event at the 2015 European Athletics U23 Championships was held in Tallinn, Estonia, at Kadriorg Stadium on 12 July.

Medalists

Results

Final
12 July

Participation
According to an unofficial count, 32 athletes from 8 countries participated in the event.

References

4 x 400 metres relay
Relays at the European Athletics U23 Championships